Pablo García Carrasco (born 5 June 2000) is a Spanish professional footballer who plays as a left-back for AD Alcorcón on loan from Sporting de Gijón.

Club career
Born in Gijón, Asturias, García joined Sporting de Gijón's Mareo in 2010, aged ten. He made his senior debut with the reserves on 1 September 2019, coming on as a second-half substitute and scoring his team's fourth goal in a 5–0 Segunda División B home rout of UD San Sebastián de los Reyes.

García played his first match as a professional on 12 September 2020, starting in a 1–0 home win against UD Logroñés in the Segunda División. On 6 August of the following year, he renewed his contract until 2025.

On 7 August 2022, García moved to Primera Federación side AD Alcorcón on loan for the season.

References

External links

2000 births
Living people
Spanish footballers
Footballers from Gijón
Association football defenders
Segunda División players
Segunda División B players
Primera Federación players
Sporting de Gijón B players
Sporting de Gijón players
AD Alcorcón footballers